David Coote is an English football referee.

Career
Coote started refereeing as a sixteen-year-old. He refereed in the Notts Alliance League, the Northern Counties East Football League, the Northern Premier League and the Conference North before being promoted to the Football League list of referees as an assistant referee. His first game in this role came in a Football League Two game between Stockport County and Hereford United. He was promoted to the list of Football League referees in 2010. In May 2014, Coote was the referee for the 2014 Football League One play-off final at Wembley Stadium between Leyton Orient and Rotherham United.

On 28 April 2018, Coote officiated his first Premier League game between Newcastle United and West Bromwich Albion. The game ended as a 1-0 victory to West Brom.

On 14 February 2023, Coote was appointed to officiate the 2023 EFL Cup final between Manchester United and Newcastle United.

Personal life
Coote is the son of David Coote who played cricket for Nottinghamshire County Cricket Club.

References

External links
 
 
 

English football referees
Living people
Year of birth missing (living people)
Place of birth missing (living people)
Premier League referees